Arkansas Highway 398 is a designation for two state highways in Arkansas. One segment in Franklin County runs  from Highway 41 to County Route 62.

Route description

Franklin County
The route starts at AR 41 south of Peter Pender and runs due east to terminate at Franklin County Route 62.

Logan County
The route connects AR 23 in Caulksville and AR 22 in Ratcliff.

History
The Franklin County route was designated and most recently paved in 1978. The segment in Logan County was last paved in 1981.

Major intersections

|-
| align=center colspan=5 | Highway 398 begins in Caulksville
|-

See also

 List of state highways in Arkansas

References

External links

398
Transportation in Franklin County, Arkansas
Transportation in Logan County, Arkansas